A yürük semai (also spelled yürük sema'i, yürük sema i, or yürük semâ'î) is a musical form in Ottoman classical music. It was a movement of a fasıl (suite). It is generally composed in an usul (rhythmic structure) of 6/8 or 6/4.

Tanburi Cemil Bey was a noted composer of yürük semai.

In Arabic music, there is an iqa' (rhythmic mode) called yūruk samā'ī (يورك سماعي), which is commonly used in the muwashshah genre.

External links
Yürük semai page
Yürük semai page
Yürük semai page

See also
Saz semai
Sama'i

Turkish music
Turkish words and phrases
Musical forms
Forms of Turkish makam music
Forms of Ottoman classical music